Events from the year 1960 in Romania. At the 1960 Summer Olympics, Iolanda Balaș wins the first Romanian Olympic gold medal.

Incumbents
President of the Provisional Presidium of the Republic: Ion Gheorghe Maurer.
Prime Minister: Chivu Stoica.
General Secretary of the Romanian Communist Party: Gheorghe Gheorghiu-Dej.

Events
 29 February – Six young writers are sentenced to prison and forced labour for "conspiracy and agitation".
 8 September – Iolanda Balaș wins the first Romanian Olympic gold medal in the 1960 Summer Olympics.
 26 October – Romania established diplomatic relations with Cuba.

Art and literature
 Telegrame, starring Grigore Vasiliu Birlic, premiers in Romania. It is shown at the 1960 Cannes Film Festival.

Births
 4 January – Tecla Marinescu, kayaker, gold medal winner at the 1984 Summer Olympics.
 10 February – Matei Machedon, mathematician.
 1 June – Chira Apostol, rower, gold medal winner at the 1984 Summer Olympics.
 22 June – Rovana Plumb, politician and president of the Social Democratic Party in 2014 and 2015.
 3 August – Mariana Constantin, gymnast, silver medal winner at the 1976 Summer Olympics.
 31 August – Vali Ionescu, long jumper, silver medal winner at the 1992 Summer Olympics.
 13 November – Teodora Ungureanu, gymnast, thrice medal winner at the 1976 Summer Olympics.
 1 December – Leontina Văduva, soprano.

Deaths
 8 January – Ion Codreanu, major general during World War II (born 1891).
 6 February – Victor Gomoiu, surgeon and founder of hospitals (born 1882).
 11 February – Clara Haskil, pianist (born 1895).
 13 May – Andrei Magieru, theologian (born 1891).
 3 June – Ana Pauker, communist leader and the world's first female foreign minister (born 1893).

References

Years of the 20th century in Romania
1960s in Romania
1960 in Romania
Romania
Romania